Lag Prau Pulté is a lake at Flims in the canton of Grisons, Switzerland.

Geography 
This lake falls completely dry in autumn and remains empty until being filled by growing underground flows depending on temperatures and snow melt rate in the mountains. During a cold period in spring, water that entered the dell of this lake may disappear again as snow melt decreases and all water remains in the underground flow. As soon as the basin is finally filled, a small river of just about half a mile in length (falling some 100 meters in level) will start flowing around May. Its destination is another lake, Lag Tuleritg, which is fed by this river in spring, disappearing in autumn and staying dry all winter. Due to its origin the water of both lakes remains grey all summer until the level starts to go down in autumn. In Lag Prau Pulté one can see another special effect caused by air being forced out of the underground, causing the lake not only to remain grey but offering frequent bubbles on the surface.

Because its proximity it is very likely that the water from Lag Tuleritg continues underground to Caumasee, although no experiments using colour was ever to prove this.

Literature 
 Hermann Anliker: Schweizer Heimatbücher: Flims; Haupt-Verlag, Bern 1961
 Sina Semadeni-Bezzola: Waldhaus Flims, Werner Classen-Verlag, Zürich 1976
 Emil Kirchen: Wenn der Berg stürzt: das Bergsturzgebiet zwischen Chur und Ilanz - Chur [etc.]: Terra Grischuna, cop. 1993. [000943845] 

Lakes of Switzerland
Lakes of Graubünden
Flims